The Kingdom of Artsakh was a medieval dependent Armenian kingdom on the territory of Syunik and Artsakh provinces, Gardman canton of Utik province, Mazaz and Varazhnunik canton of Ayrarat province. Contemporary sources referred to it as the Khachen. However, because the domain of Khachen during the reign of Prince Hasan Jalal included the entire territory of the modern Nagorno Karabakh Republic plus many contiguous lands to its west, south and north, his principality was often called the Kingdom of Artsakh. The royal 
house of Khachen was a cadet branch of the ancient Syunid dynasty and was named Khachen, after its main stronghold. Hasan-Jalal traced his descent to the Armenian Aranshahik dynasty, a family that predated the establishment of the Parthian Arsacids in the region. 

Artsakh maintained its sovereign rulers, though in the early 13th century they accepted Georgian, then Mongol suzerainty. They lost the royal title after the assassination of Hasan-Jalal (1214–1261) by the Ilkhanid ruler Arghun, but continued to rule Syunik as a principality, which from the 16th century comprised five Armenian melikdoms of Artsakh and Kashatagh melikdom of Syunik which lasted until the early 19th century.

References

Further reading
 Robert H. Hewsen. "The Kingdom of Arc'ax" in Medieval Armenian Culture (University of Pennsylvania Armenian Texts and Studies). Thomas J. Samuelian and Michael E. Stone (eds.) Chico, California: Scholars Press, 1984. .

1261 disestablishments in Asia
States and territories established in 1000
Bagratid Armenia
Former kingdoms